The women’s sprint competition in cross-country skiing at the 2022 Winter Olympics was held on 8 February, at the Kuyangshu Nordic Center and Biathlon Center in Zhangjiakou. Jonna Sundling of Sweden became the Olympic champion. Her compatriot, Maja Dahlqvist, won the silver medal, and Jessie Diggins of the United States the bronze. For Sundling and Dahlquist, this was the first Olympic medal, and for Diggins, the first individual Olympic medal.

Summary
The 2018 champion, Stina Nilsson, switched to biathlon and was not available to defend her title. The silver medalist, Maiken Caspersen Falla, and the bronze medalist, Yuliya Stupak, qualified for the Olympics. The overall leader of the 2021–22 FIS Cross-Country World Cup before the Olympics was Natalya Nepryayeva, and the sprint leader was Dahlqvist. Sundling was the 2021 World Champion in individual sprint.

The medals for the competition were presented by Pál Schmitt, IOC Member, Olympian, and 1 Gold, 2 Gold, Hungary; and the medalists' bouquets were presented by Mats Årjes, FIG Council Member; Sweden.

Qualification

Results

Qualifying
The qualifying was held at 16:00.

Quarterfinals
Quarterfinal 1

Quarterfinal 2

Quarterfinal 3

Quarterfinal 4

Quarterfinal 5

Semifinals
Semifinal 1

Semifinal 2

Final
The final was held at 19:59.

References

Women's cross-country skiing at the 2022 Winter Olympics